The 9M133M Kornet-M (also known by the export designation 9M133 Kornet-EM) Russian anti-tank guided missile (ATGM) is an improved version of the 9M133 Kornet ATGM, with increased range and an improved warhead.

Kornet-EM missiles are chiefly used on the Kornet-D system. Kornet-M missiles are also compatible with standard Kornet man-portable tripod launchers.

Design
Introduced in 2012, its vehicle mounted version is equipped with an automatic target tracker. Instead of manually placing the crosshairs on target throughout the missiles flight, the operator designates a target once and the computer tracks the target as the missile travels towards it. The beam riding system also allows a vehicle equipped with twin launchers to attack two different targets at once, increasing its rate of fire, decreases the number of vehicles needed for a mission, and can defeat vehicles equipped with an active protection system through salvo fire at one target. The system's use of an autotracker can make it more effective against low-flying aerial threats like helicopters and unmanned aerial vehicles (UAVs). Like the Kornet, the Kornet-M is designed to defeat vehicles with explosive reactive armor via a tandem-warhead. There are also Kornet-M variants equipped with thermobaric warheads. Russia has developed a new X-UAV guided aircraft missile.

Users

 (licensed production)
 (licensed production)

 (introduced in 2021)

References

Anti-tank guided missiles of Russia
Anti-tank weapons
Modern thermobaric weapons of Russia
KBP Instrument Design Bureau products
Military equipment introduced in the 2010s